Joseph Churchward  (20 August 1932 – 26 April 2013) was a Samoan-born New Zealand graphic designer and typographer. He is known for having designed an estimated 690 original typefaces, many of which are in use around the world. His designs were also used in the masthead of The Evening Post newspaper.

Churchward was born in Apia, Samoa, of Samoan, English, Scottish, Tongan and Chinese heritage. He came from the 'aiga (family) Sā Anae, and the villages of Faleasiu and Tufulele. Historian Safua Akelei Amaama writes, "Churchward's childhood memories of drawing letters in the sand in Sāmoa inspired his practice". Churchward moved to New Zealand in 1946 to study at Miramar South School in Wellington. In 1948, he obtained an Art Distinction Award in Lettering from Wellington Technical College and began a career as a commercial artist.

He founded Churchward International Typefaces in 1969. In 1970 Churchward entered an agreement with German company Berthold Fototype, who subsequently distributed his fonts throughout the world. Over the span of his career, Churchward created more than 582 original typefaces. In 2008, a special exhibition was set up for his art at the Museum of New Zealand Te Papa Tongarewa.

He was awarded the Queen's Service Medal in the 2010 Queen's Birthday Honours, for services to typography.

He died on 26 April 2013 in Wellington from bowel cancer.

References

External links
"Laban: Joseph Churchward World of Type Exhibition", Luamanuvao Winnie Laban, New Zealand government press release, 21 August 2008
Joseph Churchward on the website of the Klingspor Museum
Joseph Churchward works in Te Papa's Collections Online
Joseph Churchward in the Dictionary of New Zealand Biography

1932 births
2013 deaths
20th-century New Zealand male artists
Samoan artists
New Zealand typographers and type designers
New Zealand industrial designers
Recipients of the Queen's Service Medal
People from Apia
21st-century New Zealand male artists
New Zealand graphic designers